Horns Green is an area in the London Borough of Bromley located to the south of Cudham near the boundary with Kent.

References

Districts of the London Borough of Bromley
Hamlets in the London Borough of Bromley